Dwyfor Meirionnydd is a constituency of the Senedd, first created for the former Assembly's 2007 election. It elects one Member of the Senedd by the first past the post method of election. Also, however, it is one of eight constituencies in the Mid and West Wales electoral region, which elects four additional members, in addition to nine constituency members, to produce a degree of proportional representation for the region as a whole.

Boundaries

The constituency shares the boundaries of the Dwyfor Meirionnydd Westminster constituency, which came into use for the 2010 United Kingdom general election, created by merging into one constituency areas which were previously within the Caernarfon and Meirionnydd Nant Conwy constituencies.

Caernarfon was a Gwynedd constituency, entirely within the preserved county of Gwynedd, and one of nine constituencies in the North Wales region. 
Meirionnydd Nant Conwy was partly a Gwynedd constituency and partly a Clwyd constituency, partly within the preserved county of Gwynedd and partly within the preserved county of Clwyd, and one of eight constituencies in the Mid and West Wales electoral region.

Dwyfor Meirionnydd is a Gwynedd constituency, one of three constituencies entirely within the preserved county of Gwynedd, and one of eight constituencies in the Mid and West Wales electoral region. The other Gwynedd constituencies, however, Arfon and Ynys Môn, are within the North Wales electoral region.

The Mid and West Wales region consists of the constituencies of Brecon and Radnorshire, Carmarthen East and Dinefwr, Carmarthen West and South Pembrokeshire, Ceredigion, Dwyfor Meirionnydd, Llanelli, Montgomeryshire and Preseli Pembrokeshire.

Voting
In general elections for the Senedd each voter has two votes. The first vote may be used to vote for a candidate to become the Member of the Senedd for the voter's constituency, elected by the first-past-the-post system. The second vote may be used to vote for a regional closed party list of candidates. Additional member seats are allocated from the lists by the d'Hondt method, with constituency results being taken into account in the allocation.

Members of the Senedd
The seat had been represented since its creation in 2007 by Dafydd Elis-Thomas of Plaid Cymru, the Assembly's former Presiding Officer. He previously represented the former constituency of Meirionnydd Nant Conwy from 1999 to 2007, and was the Westminster MP for the area from 1974 to 1992. He was succeeded by Mabon ap Gwynfor of Plaid Cymru.

Elections

Elections in the 2020s

Elections in the 2010s

Regional ballots rejected: 132

Elections in the 2000s

2003 Electorate: 57,428
Regional ballots rejected: 227

Notes

Due to boundary changes it is only possible to compare election results from 2003 and 2007 by creating notional figures. These notional results, compiled by professors Colin Rallings and Michael Thrasher of Plymouth University, take the figures from the 2003 election and apply them to the new boundaries which are being used for the first time on 3 May 2007. Notional results for this seat with regards to the list seat were not calculated.

References

Senedd constituencies in the Mid and West Wales electoral region
2007 establishments in Wales
Constituencies established in 2007